GLOW is an American comedy-drama television series created by Liz Flahive and Carly Mensch for Netflix. The series revolves around a fictionalization of the characters and gimmicks of the 1980s syndicated women's professional wrestling circuit Gorgeous Ladies of Wrestling (or GLOW) founded by David McLane.

The first season consists of 10 episodes and was released on June 23, 2017. On August 10, 2017, Netflix renewed the series for a second season of 10 episodes, which was released on June 29, 2018. The series was renewed on August 20, 2018, for a third season, which was released on August 9, 2019. On September 20, 2019, the series was renewed for a fourth and final season. However, in October 2020, that decision was reversed by Netflix, and the final season was canceled due to the COVID-19 pandemic causing a production shutdown.

Premise
In Los Angeles in 1985, Ruth Wilder, a struggling actress, auditions along with many other women in a fledgling professional wrestling promotion called the Gorgeous Ladies of Wrestling (GLOW). Traditionally minded in her approach to acting and highly idealistic, she clashes with GLOW's director Sam Sylvia due to his cynical demeanor and often unconventional work style. Ruth discovers early on that Sylvia has employed her former best friend, retired soap opera actress Debbie Eagan to star in the show. Ruth and Debbie had fallen out with one another after Ruth had an affair with Debbie's husband, Mark, whom Debbie then divorced. The tension between the two women promises either to make or break the developing show. The series follows the personal and professional lives of the fictional show's numerous cast and crew as they navigate the 1980s in Southern California and Southern Nevada.

Cast

Main
 Alison Brie as Ruth "Zoya the Destroya" Wilder
 Betty Gilpin as Debbie "Liberty Belle" Eagan
 Sydelle Noel as Cherry "Junkchain"/"Black Magic" Bang
 Britney Young as Carmen "Machu Picchu" Wade
 Marc Maron as Sam Sylvia
 Britt Baron as Justine "Scab" Biagi (seasons 2–3; recurring season 1)
 Kate Nash as Rhonda "Britannica" Richardson (seasons 2–3; recurring season 1)
 Gayle Rankin as Sheila "The She Wolf" (seasons 2–3; recurring season 1)
 Kia Stevens as Tammé "The Welfare Queen" Dawson (seasons 2–3; recurring season 1)
 Jackie Tohn as Melanie "Melrose" Rosen (seasons 2–3; recurring season 1)
 Chris Lowell as Sebastian "Bash" Howard (season 3; recurring seasons 1–2)

Recurring

Introduced in season one
 Bashir Salahuddin as Keith Bang
 Rich Sommer as Mark Eagan
 Sunita Mani as Arthie "Beirut the Mad Bomber" Premkumar
 Ellen Wong as Jenny "Fortune Cookie" Chey
 Kimmy Gatewood as Stacey "Ethel Rosenblatt"/"Ozone" Beswick
 Rebekka Johnson as Dawn "Edna Rosenblatt"/"Nuke" Rivecca
 Marianna Palka as Reggie "Vicky the Viking" Walsh
 Alex Rich as Florian Becker
 Andrew Friedman as Glen Klitnick
 Casey Johnson as Billy Offal 
 Ravil Isyanov as Gregory
 Marc Evan Jackson as Gary
 Elizabeth Perkins as Birdie Howard

Introduced in season two
 Shakira Barrera as Yolanda "Junkchain" Rivas
 Victor Quinaz as Russell Barroso
 Horatio Sanz as Ray
 Annabella Sciorra as Rosalie Biagi 
 Wyatt Nash as Phil
 Patrick Renna as Toby “Cupcake” Matkins
 Phoebe Strole as Susan
 Eli Goree as Earnest Dawson
 Paul Fitzgerald as Tom Grant

Introduced in season three
 Geena Davis as Sandy Devereaux St. Clair
 Breeda Wool as Denise
 Kevin Cahoon as Bobby Barnes
 Toby Huss as J. J. "Tex" McCready
 Nick Clifford as Paul

The show's cast features several real-life professional wrestlers, most prominently Kia Stevens (Tammé), who has wrestled as Awesome Kong for TNA and AEW while wrestling as Kharma for WWE. Others with formal experience include:

 John Hennigan as Salty "The Sack" Johnson, a trainer who appeared in the first episode of Season 1 
 Tyrus and Carlos Edwin as Carmen's wrestler brothers 
 Joey Ryan as a wrestler known as Mr. Monopoly
 Laura James as Mr. Monopoly's valet, "Crystal"
 Alex Riley as a wrestler known as Steel Horse
 Brooke Hogan as night club manager Amber Fredrickson
 Chavo Guerrero Jr. as Chico Guapo
 Christopher Daniels and Frankie Kazarian as unnamed wrestlers

Hulk Hogan, Ric Flair, and Gorgeous George appear in archived video footage in episodes 1 and 4.

Episodes

Production
The idea for the series came when Flahive and Mensch, who at the time were looking to make a new female-centric show, came across the 2012 documentary GLOW: The Story of the Gorgeous Ladies of Wrestling. Before this, neither woman had heard of the GLOW wrestling promotion, and they became intrigued by the premise of producing a fictionalized version of it. Both women found the storyline intriguing as a way of exploring the aftermath of the 1970s Woman's Liberation Movement, with Flahive telling Rolling Stone, "We wanted to look back on the 1970s, coming out of the women's movement, and into the 1980s, and ask the question: Did it work? Did things get better?" To this end, it was important for the series to maintain a tension between whether the league was exploiting women or empowering them.

Ursula Hayden, the owner of the GLOW company, served as a consultant on the series and helped Flahive and Mensch with creating the show. Hayden was also on the original 1980s promotion as Babe, the Farmer's Daughter.

Chavo Guerrero Jr. of the famous Guerrero wrestling family also served as a consultant on the series and helped train the actresses. His uncle Mando Guerrero had served in the same role for the original series. Guerrero Jr. also appeared in two episodes of the second season, including the season finale.

Filming
The series has filmed in several locations in Los Angeles; mainly in the San Fernando Valley. Chavo's Boxing Gym, which is GLOW's training grounds, was a combination of two locations: the interior was a studio set while the exterior was the rear of the San Fernando Masonic Lodge. The Pink Motel in Sun Valley was used as a stand-in for The Dusty Spur Motel, GLOW's sleeping quarters. Other notable locations include the Mayan Theater and the Hollywood Palladium.

Principal production on season 2 commenced in October 2017.

Marketing
For the Spain market, Netflix España released a series of promo videos featuring singers Marta Sánchez and Vicky Larraz. The first video, titled "No Controles", features Sánchez imitating Ruth's imaginary wrestler scene from the first episode. The second video has Sánchez and Larraz squaring off in the ring.

For the Brazil market, Netflix Brasil released a promo video featuring singers Gretchen and Rita Cadillac auditioning for GLOW.

Funko released Pop! Vinyl figures of Ruth and Debbie in mid-2018.

Canceled final season
In September 2019, Netflix renewed the show for a fourth and final season. On February 19, 2020, Alison Brie posted a photo from the set on Instagram, signaling that they were beginning production on the final episodes. In March 2020, production was shut down on the season due to the COVID-19 pandemic, which had stopped nearly all TV and film productions in Los Angeles. They had already finished the first episode and were about to start filming the second.

On October 5, 2020, creators Liz Flahive and Carly Mensch revealed in a statement that the fourth season was canceled and would not be completed or aired. It was explained that the show had some of the biggest obstacles to overcome as Netflix was trying to figure out how to get their shows back to work, mostly due to uncertainty about how to prevent an outbreak on set with its wrestling theme and increased COVID-19 related costs added to an already expensive budget. The earliest the show's final season would have aired was in 2022, which would have been too long of a gap for Netflix to handle, since the previous season aired in 2019.

Soundtrack
The series features several songs from the 1980s, as well as tracks from the 1950s, 1960s, and 1970s. The opening theme used for the full-length opening titles in episode 1 of each season is "The Warrior" by Scandal.

Season 1 songs

 "You Make Me Feel (Mighty Real)" by Sylvester
 "Separate Ways (Worlds Apart)" by Journey
 "Stir It Up" by Patti LaBelle
 "The Look" by Roxette
 "We Don't Get Along" by The Go-Go's
 "4-3-1" by The Jetzons
 "Every Little Bit" by Jackie James
 "Life in a Northern Town" by The Dream Academy
 "Movin' Out (Anthony's Song)" by Billy Joel
 "Head Over Heels" by Tears for Fears
 "Make That Money (Scrooge’s Song)" by Alice Cooper
 "Rock You Like a Hurricane (2011 Re-recording)" by Scorpions
 "Ready Steady Go" by Generation X
 "Dare" by Stan Bush
 "Theme of Exodus" by Ernest Gold
 "Angel" by The Jetzons
 "Under Pressure" by Queen and David Bowie
 "Car Wash" by Rose Royce
 "Magic Moments" by Perry Como
 "Things Can Only Get Better" by Howard Jones
 "Invincible" by Pat Benatar

Season 2 songs

 "You May Be Right" by Billy Joel
 "Just Like Honey" by The Jesus and Mary Chain
 "It's Like That" by Run-DMC
 "Sweat" by The System
 "Situation" by Yazoo
 "Baby You Got It" by Brenton Wood
 "You're All I Need to Get By" by Aretha Franklin
 "Smalltown Boy" by Bronski Beat
 "I Know What Boys Like" by The Waitresses
 "Far From Over" by Frank Stallone
 "You Make My Dreams" by Hall & Oates
 "Destination Unknown" by Missing Persons
 "Makeover" by the GLOW Girls
 "Don't Kidnap" by the GLOW Girls
 "Kyrie" by Mr. Mister
 "Cross My Heart" by Richard Myhill
 "Can't You See the World Through My Eyes?" by Donnie Barren
 "Don't You Want Me" by The Human League
 "Crazy for You" by Madonna
 "Man on the Corner" by Genesis
 "Chapel of Love" by The Dixie Cups
 "Nothing's Gonna Stop Us Now" by Starship

Season 3 songs

 "Quando quando quando" by Engelbert Humperdinck
 "Baby Let Me Kiss You" by Fern Kinney
 "Disorder" by Joy Division
 "Big Mess" by Devo
 "Gypsy" by Fleetwood Mac
 "Light of a Clear Blue Morning" by Dolly Parton
 "When the Chips Are Down" by Ricky Nelson
 "Cities in Dust" by Siouxsie and the Banshees
 "Barracuda" by Heart
 "Running Up That Hill" by Kate Bush

Quiet Riot's cover of "Cum On Feel the Noize" was used for the Season 1 trailer, while "Maniac" by Michael Sembello was used for the Season 2 trailer and "Listen to Your Heart" by Roxette for the Season 3 trailer. Songs covered by the cast include the Thompson Twins' "Hold Me Now" and Barbra Streisand's "This Is One of Those Moments".

Reception

Critical response
GLOW was praised by critics upon its release. On Rotten Tomatoes, season 1 has a 94% approval rating with an average score of 7.66/10 based on 107 reviews. The site's critical consensus reads, "With spot-on 1980s period detail, knockout writing, and a killer cast, GLOW shines brightly." The first season has a Metacritic score of 81 out of 100, based on 37 critics, indicating "universal acclaim". Darren Franich of Entertainment Weekly gave the first season an A rating, calling it "a silly-smart masterpiece, with an ensemble cast entirely made up of breakout characters". Sophie Gilbert of The Atlantic said, "...it’s just a blast to watch women having so much fun. GLOW fully owns its campiness and its showy aesthetics, but it’s smart and subversive underneath the glitter."

The second season received even higher critical acclaim. On Rotten Tomatoes, season 2 has a 98% approval rating with an average score of 8.77/10 based on 84 reviews. The site's critical consensus reads, "Fearlessly led by its excellent ensemble, GLOWs second season adds a new layer of drama without sacrificing its self-effacing, delightfully silly humor." The second season has a Metacritic score of 85 out of 100, based on 20 critics, indicating "universal acclaim".

On Rotten Tomatoes, the third season has an 86% approval rating with an average score of 8/10 based on 65 reviews. The site's critical consensus reads, "GLOW dives even deeper into the lives of its divas to deliver a knock-out third season that solidifies its place as one of TV's most compelling—and hilarious—character studies." The third season has a Metacritic score of 80 out of 100, based on 17 critics, indicating "generally favorable reviews".

Pro-wrestling community response
The series received mixed reactions from some of the original GLOW wrestlers. Jeanne Basone, who wrestled in the promotion as "Hollywood", commented that "Some of the training and the gym and the outfits they get correct." Patricia Summerland, who played "Sunny the California Girl" in the promotion, saw Marc Maron's character Sam Sylvia as a stark contrast to original GLOW director Matt Cimber. Eileen O'Hara, who was known as "Melody Trouble Vixen (MTV)", felt that the series did not properly acknowledge how groundbreaking they were. Lisa Moretti, who competed as "Tina Ferrari" and would go on to the greatest fame among GLOW alumnae as Ivory in the WWF/WWE as a three-time WWF Women's Champion during the Attitude Era, said that she was relieved that the series isn't a documentary because it was more entertaining to have a mix between fact and fiction.

More positive reception came from mainstream wrestling figures including Kurt Angle. Ethan Sapienza of Slate noted accurate comparisons between the series and WWE as well as the various regional promotions that made up the National Wrestling Alliance during its heyday.

Accolades

Comic book
A four-issue comic book series based on the show was released in March 2019 by IDW Publishing, written by Tini Howard and illustrated by Hannah Templer. Flahive and Mensch served as executive producers on the comics. A second four-issue series by IDW Publishing, GLOW vs. The Babyface, co-written by former professional wrestler AJ Mendez and actress Aimee Garcia and illustrated by Templer, published its first issue in November 2019, with issues 2-4 released from December 2019 through February 2020.

In media
Sydelle Noel, Britney Young, Kia Stevens, Ellen Wong and Jackie Tohn made a cameo appearance as their GLOW characters in the music video for the 2017 Katy Perry song "Swish Swish".

See also
Heels

References

External links
 
 

 
2017 American television series debuts
2019 American television series endings
2010s American comedy-drama television series
2010s American LGBT-related comedy television series
2010s American LGBT-related drama television series
American action comedy television series
American professional wrestling television series
English-language Netflix original programming
HIV/AIDS in television
Lesbian-related television shows
Television productions cancelled due to the COVID-19 pandemic
Television series about actors
Television series about television
Television series based on actual events
Television series set in the 1980s
Television series set in 1985
Television series set in 1986
Television shows filmed in Los Angeles
Television shows set in Los Angeles
Television shows set in the Las Vegas Valley
Women's professional wrestling